Elegance Bratton (born May 3, 1979) is an American filmmaker and photographer. He began his career in the 2010s, writing, directing, and producing a variety of projects including the short film Walk for Me, the reality television series My House, and the documentary film Pier Kids. 

In 2022, his feature film directorial debut, The Inspection, premiered at the 2022 Toronto International Film Festival and was released by A24 that November.

Early life

Elegance was born in Jersey City, New Jersey and raised in Phillipsburg, New Jersey. At age 16, he was kicked out of his home for being gay and spent 10 years being homeless before joining the Marines. He served as a combat camera production specialist in Camp H.M. Smith in Hawaii, shooting videos and taking photographs. He graduated from Columbia University with a degree in African American Studies, and received his MFA from New York University Tisch School of the Arts for directing and writing.

Career
Bratton has worked as a director, writer, producer, and photographer since the early 2010s. His photographic compilation Bound by Night, shortlisted for the Kassel 2014 photo-book award.

In 2016, he directed a short film, Walk for Me, as an assignment in his second year in the Graduate Film program at Tisch. The film is about trans motherhood in ballroom culture. Walk for Me was released on the Criterion Channel.

He later directed the documentary film, Pier Kids, about three LGBTQ homeless youths in New York City, was released in 2019. The film has been featured in media, such as the VICE, ABC News, The Huffington Post, OUT Magazine, and GLAAD. 

His debut feature film, The Inspection, was announced in 2021 with a cast that includes Jeremy Pope, Gabrielle Union, Bokeem Woodbine and Raúl Castillo, with Gamechanger Films set to produce, and A24 set to produce and distribute. Bratton also wrote the screenplay. The film had its world premiere at the 2022 Toronto International Film Festival on September 8, 2022. It will also screen at the 60th New York Film Festival on October 14, 2022, the Austin Film Festival on Oct. 29, 2022 and it is scheduled to be released in the United States on November 18, 2022 by A24.

Filmography

Accolades 
In 2022 Bratton was named a United States Artists (USA) Fellow. On October 22, 2022, he received the Breakthrough Director & Writer Award at the Montclair Film Festival. On January 27, 2023, Bratton was the inaugural recipient of the Coolidge Breakthrough Artist Award from Coolidge Corner Theatre.

References

External links 

Living people
American documentary filmmakers
American film producers
American photographers
LGBT film directors
LGBT people from New Jersey
People from Jersey City, New Jersey
People from Phillipsburg, New Jersey
1979 births
Columbia University School of General Studies alumni
Tisch School of the Arts alumni